2014 Thai Division 2 League Southern Region is the 6th season of the League competition since its establishment in 2009. It is in the third tier of the Thai football league system.

Changes from last season

Team changes

Promoted clubs

No club was promoted to the Thai Division 1 League. Last years league champions Nara United failed to qualify from the 2013 Regional League Division 2 championship pool.

Relocated clubs

Prachuap re-located to the Southern Division from the Central-West Division 2013.

Teams

Stadium and locations

League table

References

External links
 Football Association of Thailand

Regional League South Division seasons